"Trăiască Regele" (Long live the King), also known as the "Imnul Regal" (Royal Anthem), was the national anthem of the Kingdom of Romania between 1884 and 1948. The music was composed in 1861 by Eduard Hübsch, an army captain who later became the chief of the music department of the Minister of War. The lyrics were written by the Romanian poet Vasile Alecsandri in 1881, when Romania became a Kingdom.

It is derived from Hübsch's "Marș triumfal", the first anthem of Romania. With Trăiască Regele being adopted in 1884, both are essentially the same song.

Lyrics

References

 Evenimentul Zilei, 15 October 2005, "Cinci regimuri, cinci imnuri"

External links
 "Trăiască Regele" on Youtube

Kingdom of Romania
Historical national anthems
Royal anthems
National symbols of Romania
Romanian patriotic songs
European anthems
1884 establishments in Romania
1881 songs
Romanian-language songs